Vancouver Magazine is an English-language lifestyle magazine focused on Vancouver, British Columbia and the Lower Mainland. Vancouver Magazine describes its mission as informing, guiding and entertaining residents of a "dynamic, international city." The main areas of coverage are city issues, culture, restaurants, drinking, fashion and travel.

History and profile
Founded in 1967, the magazine started its life as Dick McLean's Greater Vancouver Greeter Guide. In 1973 it became known as Vancouver's Leisure Magazine, when editor Mac Parry took over, though over the course of a few months it was retitled as simply Vancouver.. Parry would go on to be editor for 16 years.

Vancouver Magazine published 10 times a year and is owned by the Yellow Pages, and shares an office and editorial staff with sister publication Western Living It also currently publishes the special interest annual magazine Best of the City and Neighbourhood Guide. Yellow Pages acquired Vancouver Magazine and Western Living from Transcontinental in 2015.

In 2012, it won Magazine of the Year - Western Canada at the Western Magazine Awards.

References

External links
Vancouver Magazine - Official site. Retrieved 12 February 2013.

1967 establishments in British Columbia
Lifestyle magazines published in Canada
Magazines established in 1967
Magazines published in Vancouver